Asureswar is a village in Odisha, India. It is located in the Nischintakoili block of Cuttack district.

The following villages come under the administration of Asureswar panchayat: Anasarapur, Bhagabatpur, Bharigol, Dhinkipada, Kendilo, and Kulagaonisahi.

Photo gallery

References 

Villages in Cuttack district